The Padma is a major river in Bangladesh.

Padma may also refer to:

Common meanings
 Padma (attribute), the lotus, a symbolic flower repeatedly referred to in Buddhism, Hinduism, and Jainism
 Padma, in the Indian numbering system equal to one quadrillion (1015)
 Padmaprabha, 6th Jain Tirthankara
 Padmasambhava, a Buddhist scholar

Places
 Padma, Hazaribagh (community development block), in Jharkhand, India
 Padma, Hazaribagh, in Jharkhand, India

Notable people
 Padma (politician) (born 1945), Indian politician
 Padma Choling (born 1952), Chairman of the Tibet Autonomous Region (TAR), China
 Padma Desai (born 1932), Indian-American development economist
 Padma Gole  (1913–1998), Marathi poet from Maharashtra 
 Padma Khanna (born 1949), popular actress of Bollywood and Bhojpuri cinema
 Padma Lakshmi (born 1970), a host of the reality TV program Top Chef
Padma Narsey Lal (born 1951), Fijian ecological economist
 Padma Sachdev (1940–2021), Indian writer, novelist in Dogri
 Padma Kant Shukla (1950–2013), Indian physicist
 Padma Talwalkar (born 1948), Indian classical vocalist
 Padma Viswanathan (born 1968), Canadian playwright

Arts, entertainment, and media
Padma Patil, a fictional character from the Harry Potter books
 Padma Purana, a Hindu religious text, one of the major eighteen Puranas

See also
 Padme (disambiguation)